Jerry W. Tillman (October 10, 1940 – February 4, 2023) was an American politician who was a Republican member of the North Carolina General Assembly, representing the state's twenty-sixth Senate district, including constituents in Guilford and Randolph counties.  A retired teacher, coach and school administrator from Archdale, North Carolina, Tillman served nine terms in the state Senate, retiring June 30, 2020. Tillman was the Senate Majority Whip and was Chair or Co-Chair of several committees in the NC Senate. In 2013, Senator Tillman co-authored and introduced the state's controversial "voting reform act," which will require photo ID to vote.

References

External links
 Hard Evidence Supports the Need for Voter ID Laws

|-

|-

1940 births
2023 deaths
Republican Party North Carolina state senators
People from Archdale, North Carolina
Elon University alumni
University of North Carolina at Greensboro alumni
21st-century American politicians